The Galatian War was a war between the Galatian Gauls and the Roman Republic supported by their allies Pergamum in 189 BC. The war was fought in Galatia in central Asia Minor, in present-day Turkey.

The Romans had just defeated the Seleucids in the Roman-Syrian War and had forced them to thereby sue for peace. Following their recently successful operation in Syria, the Romans then turned their attention towards the Gallic tribes of Galatia who had emigrated to Asia Minor almost 100 years prior to the ensuing military engagement. Gnaeus Manlius Vulso, the consul, excused the invasion by saying that it was in retaliation for the Galatians supplying troops to the Seleucids during the war. Vulso embarked on this campaign without the permission of the Roman Senate. Joined by Pergamum, the Romans marched inland and attacked the Galatians. They defeated the Galatians in a battle on Mount Olympus and followed up the victory by defeating a larger army near Ancyra (modern Ankara, Turkey). 

These defeats forced the Galatians to sue for peace and the Romans returned to the coast of Asia Minor. However, when Manlius Vulso returned to Rome, he was charged with threatening the peace between the Seleucids and Rome. He was cleared and was granted a triumph by the Senate.

Prelude

In 191 BC, Antiochus the Great, the Emperor of the Seleucid Empire of Asia, invaded Greece. The Romans decided to intervene and they defeated the Seleucids at the Battle of Thermopylae. The defeat by Rome forced the Seleucids to retreat back to Asia Minor. The Romans followed them across the Aegean Sea and together with their allies, Pergamum, they decisively defeated the Seleucids at the Battle of Magnesia.

The Seleucids sued for peace and began settling it with Scipio Asiaticus. In spring, the new consul, Gnaeus Manlius Vulso, arrived to take control of the army from Scipio Asiaticus. He was sent to conclude the treaty that Scipio was arranging. However, he was not content with the task given to him and he started to plan a new war. He addressed the soldiers and congratulated them on their victory and then proposed a new war, against the Galatian Gauls of Asia Minor. The pretext he used for the invasion was that the Galatians had supplied soldiers to the Seleucid army at the Battle of Magnesia. The principal reason for the invasion was Manlius' desire to seize the wealth of the Galatians, who had become rich from plundering their neighbours, and to gain glory for himself.

This war was the first occasion on which a Roman general had started a war without the permission of the senate or the people. This was a dangerous precedent and this became an example for the future.

Manlius started his war preparation by summoning the Pergamese to help. However, the King of Pergamum, Eumenes II, was in Rome so his brother, Attalus, who was serving as regent, took command of the Pergamese army. He joined the Roman army a few days later with 1,000 infantry and 500 cavalry.

March inland
The combined Roman-Pergamese army started their march from Ephesus. They advanced inland passing Magnesia on the Maeander and into the territory of Alabanda where they were met by 1,000 infantry and 300 cavalry led by Attalus' brother. They then marched to Antiochia where they were met by Antiochus' son, Seleucus who offered corn as part of the treaty that was being concluded.

They marched inland through the upper Maeander valley and Pamphylia gathering levies from local princes and tyrants without much opposition. However, they then advanced into the territory of Cibrya, ruled by the tyrant Moagetes, known for his cruelty. When the Roman envoys reached the city, the tyrant begged them not to ravage the territory because he was a Roman ally and promised to give them fifteen talents. The envoys asked Moagetes to send envoys to Vulso's camp. Vulso met them as they approached the camp and addressed them as Polybius writes:

"Not only had Moagĕtes shown himself the most determined enemy of Rome, of all the princes in Asia, but had done his very best to overthrow their empire, and deserved punishment rather than friendship."

The envoys were terrified by his angry response and asked the consul to meet the tyrant for an interview to which Vulso agreed. The next day the tyrant emerged from the city and pleaded with Vulso to accept the fifteen talents. Vulso replied:

"If he did not pay five hundred talents, and be thankful that he was allowed to do so, he would not loot the country, but he would storm and sack the city."

The tyrant however, was able to persuade Vulso to reduce the price to 100 talents and promised to provide him with 1,000 medimni of wheat. Thus Moagĕtes managed to save his city. When the consul crossed the River Colobatus he was met by ambassadors from the town of Sinda in Pisidia. The ambassadors asked for assistance against the city of Termessus who had taken over all their country except for the capitol.

The consul agreed to the offer. He entered Termessian territory, allowing them to enter his alliance for fifty talents and for their withdrawal from Sindian territory. Vulso proceeded to seize the city of Cyrmasa in Pisidia and with it a large booty. He then took the city of Lysinoe before accepting a tribute of fifty talents and 20,000 medimni of barley  and wheat from the city of Sagalassus.

The consul reached the Rhotrine Springs and he was once again met by Seleucus. Seleucus took the injured and sick Romans with him to Apamea as well as supplying the Romans some guides. They marched for three days after departing from the springs and on the third day they arrived on the border with the Tolistobogii, one of the three Galatian tribes. The consul held an assembly and addressed his troops about the upcoming war. He then sent envoys to Eposognatus, chieftain of the Tectosagi, the only chieftain who was friendly with Pergamum. The envoys returned and replied that the chieftain of the Tectosagi begged the Romans not to invade his territory. He also claimed that he would attempt to force the submission of the other chieftains.

The army marched deeper inland and pitched camp near a Galatian stronghold called Cuballum. While they were there, the Galatian cavalry attacked the army's advance guard and caused significant casualties before the Roman cavalry counter-attacked and drove back the Galatians with heavy losses. The consul, knowing that he was in reach of the enemy, decided to move forward more cautiously.

Battle of Mount Olympus

The Romans and the Pergamenese arrived at the city of Gordium and found it deserted. As they camped there they were met by a messenger sent by Eposognatus. The messenger reported that Eposognatus had failed in persuading the Galatians not to attack and that they were mustering nearby in the mountains.

The Tolostobogii occupied Mount Olympus, while the Tectosagi and the Trocmi went to another mountain. On Mount Olympus, the Galatians had fortified themselves with a ditch and other defensive works. For the first two days, the Romans scouted the mountains. On the third day, the Romans attacked the Galatian position with their skirmishers. The Roman auxiliary archers, slingers and javelinmen inflicted heavy losses on the poorly armored Galatians, while those who attempted to get into close combat were overcame by the superior weapons and armour of the Roman velites. The battle turned to a massacre for the Galatians when the Roman legions finally stormed their camp. The Galatians lost some 10,000 men and had around 40,000 captured during the aftermath.

Battle of Ancyra
After the Roman victory at Mount Olympus, the Tectosagi begged them not to attack them and asked to meet him for a conference halfway between their camp and Ancyra. The main aim of the conference was for the Tectosagi to delay the Roman attack so that they could allow the women and children to retreat across the Halys River. Their other aim was to assassinate Manlius while he was at the conference. While they were going to the conference the Romans saw the Galatian cavalry charging at them. In the skirmish that followed the Galatians overpowered Manlius' small cavalry escort due to their numbers but were driven back when the cavalry that had been accompanying the Roman foragers arrived and forced the Galatians to retreat.

The Romans spent the next two days scouting the surrounding area and on the third day they met the Galatian army consisting of 50,000 men. The Romans started the battle by attacking with their skirmishers. Again the Galatians were decimated by the hail of missiles, so much so that Galatian centre were shattered by the first charge of the legions and fled in the direction of their camp. The flanks stood their grounds for longer but were eventually forced to retreat. The Romans chased them, plundered the Galatian camp as the surviving Galatians fled across the river to join the women, children and the Trocmi.

Aftermath
These two crushing military defeats forced the Galatians to sue for peace. This campaign greatly enriched Vulso and his legions as the Galatians had gathered great wealth through their many conquests in Asia Minor. The Galatians sent envoys to Vulso asking for peace but Vulso, who at the time was hurrying back to Ephesus because winter was approaching, bade them to come to Ephesus.

Vulso remained in Asia Minor for another year. During that time he concluded the Treaty of Apamea with Antiochus and divided the lands of the Asia Minor coast between Pergamum and Rhodes. When the Galatian envoys came, Vulso told them that King Eumenes II of Pergamum would give them the terms of the peace when he arrived back from Rome.

Vulso began his return journey to Rome in 188 BC and arrived in 187 BC. When he returned to Rome, he received much criticism because of his unauthorised war against the Galatians. However, he eventually overcame the arguments and was awarded a triumph by the Senate.

Citations

References

Primary sources
Livy, translated by Henry Bettison, (1976). Rome and the Mediterranean. London: Penguin Classics. .
Polybius, translated by Frank W. Walbank, (1979). The Rise of the Roman Empire. New York: Penguin Classics. .

On-line sources

 
 
 

Wars involving the Roman Republic
Wars involving Pergamon
Ancient Galatia
Wars involving the Celts
189 BC
180s BC conflicts
2nd century BC in the Roman Republic